Fred Achelam (born 27 January 2001) is a Ugandan cricketer. In April 2018, he was named in Uganda's squad for the 2018 ICC World Cricket League Division Four tournament in Malaysia. He played in Uganda's opening match of the tournament, against Malaysia.

In July 2018, he was part of Uganda's squad in the Eastern sub region group for the 2018–19 ICC World Twenty20 Africa Qualifier tournament. In September 2018, he was named in Uganda's squad for the 2018 Africa T20 Cup. He made his Twenty20 debut for Uganda in the 2018 Africa T20 Cup on 14 September 2018.

In May 2019, he was named in Uganda's squad for the Regional Finals of the 2018–19 ICC T20 World Cup Africa Qualifier tournament in Uganda. He made his Twenty20 International (T20I) debut for Uganda against Ghana on 23 May 2019. In July 2019, he was one of twenty-five players named in the Ugandan training squad, ahead of the Cricket World Cup Challenge League fixtures in Hong Kong. In November 2019, he was named in Uganda's squad for the Cricket World Cup Challenge League B tournament in Oman. He made his List A debut, for Uganda against Bermuda, on 6 December 2019.

In November 2021, he was named in Uganda's squad for the Regional Final of the 2021 ICC Men's T20 World Cup Africa Qualifier tournament in Rwanda. In May 2022, he was named in Uganda's side for the 2022 Uganda Cricket World Cup Challenge League B tournament.

References

External links
 

2001 births
Living people
Ugandan cricketers
Uganda Twenty20 International cricketers
Place of birth missing (living people)
21st-century Ugandan people